Ključar is a village in central Croatia, in the municipality of Vojnić, Karlovac County. It is connected by the D6 highway.

Demographics
According to the 2011 census, the village of Ključar 
has 86 inhabitants. This represents 71.67% of its pre-war population according to the 1991 census.

The 1991 census recorded that 97.50% of the village population were ethnic Serbs (117/120), 1.67% were Yugoslavs (2/120) and 0.83% were of other/unknown ethnic origin (1/120).

Sights
 Memorial to the victims of fascism and fallen partisans in WW2

References

Populated places in Karlovac County
Serb communities in Croatia